was a Japanese freestyle wrestler. He won the world cup in 1973 and an Olympic gold medal in 1976 and placed third at the 1975 World Championships.

References

External links
 

1952 births
2018 deaths
Olympic wrestlers of Japan
Wrestlers at the 1972 Summer Olympics
Wrestlers at the 1976 Summer Olympics
Japanese male sport wrestlers
Olympic gold medalists for Japan
Olympic medalists in wrestling
Medalists at the 1976 Summer Olympics
World Wrestling Championships medalists
Sportspeople from Ōita Prefecture
20th-century Japanese people
21st-century Japanese people